The 1965–66 Soviet Cup was the eighth edition of the Soviet Cup ice hockey tournament, and the first since 1961. 61 teams participated in the tournament, which was won by CSKA Moscow for the fifth consecutive season.

Tournament

First round

Second round

1/16 finals

1/8 finals

Quarterfinals

Semifinals

Final

External links 
 Season on hockeyarchives.info
 Season on hockeyarchives.ru

Cup
Soviet Cup (ice hockey) seasons